Kim Jong-oh (May 22, 1921 – March 30, 1966) was a South Korean Republic of Korea Army colonel and general in the Korean War. He was born in North Chungcheong Province. He was active in the First Republic of South Korea and Third Republic of South Korea. He was the 10th president of the Republic of Korea Military Academy (1952–1954) and commander of the Republic of Korea 1st Army.

Life 
Kim Jong-oh was born on May 22, 1921, in what is now North Chungcheong Province. He went to Chuo University to study law in order to help Koreans. In 1944, he was conscripted in the Imperial Japanese Army while he was attending Chuo University. He was appointed as Second lieutenant. After Empire of Japan surrendered, Kim came back to Korea. In 1946, he became Second lieutenant (Service Number 10031) of Korean Army. The next year, he became Lieutenant Colonel. In 1949, he became a Colonel. As the commander of 1st Brigade, he brought victory against the North Korean Army before the Korean War.

At the outbreak of the Korean War, he commanded the 6th Infantry Division. He delayed the advance of the North Korean Army for 5 days. In Eumseong County, Kim attacked the 48th Brigade of North Korea. His division killed thousand of men and captured 97 men. For this, Kim was promoted to Brigade General. In September 1950, his division participated The Great Naktong Offensive. But during the offensive, Kim was injured and appointed as commander of 9th Infantry Division. But he was brought back to the headquarters later. In 1952, he was appointed as the commander of 9th Infantry Division and participated in Battle of White Horse. For 10 days, his division defended the White Horse fortress against three Chinese divisions under 35th Army Corps of China. His division finally made the Chinese Army to retreat.

After the declare of armistice, Kim was appointed as commander of I Corps. Later he became Chairman of the Joint Chiefs of Staff, and chief of staff of Korean Army. In 1962, he became Daejang, and he retired from the army in 1965. On March 30, 1966, Kim died. His funeral was proceeded in the headquarters of Army in Buddhist ways.

Bibliography

References 

1921 births
1966 deaths
People from North Chungcheong Province
Republic of Korea Army personnel
People of the Korean War
South Korean military personnel of the Korean War
Allied occupation of Korea
Chiefs of Staff of the Army (South Korea)
Chairmen of the Joint Chiefs of Staff (South Korea)
Gimhae Kim clan
South Korean Roman Catholics